Zezhou County is a county in the southeast of Shanxi province, China, bordering Henan province to the south. It is under the administration of the prefecture-level city of Jincheng, and surrounds the latter's central Chengqu, or urban area. Its population is approximately 480,000.  It is accessible via the G55 Erenhot–Guangzhou Expressway.

References
www.xzqh.org 

 
County-level divisions of Shanxi